The Amur campaign was a war waged by the Qing dynasty against peoples living along the Amur River region from 1639 to 1643. It ended in the subjugation and integration of the natives into the Eight Banners.

Background
The recently created Qing dynasty under Hong Taiji expanded rapidly during the 1630s in all directions. One of the areas which came under attack by Qing expansionism was the northeast Amur river region where people such as the Evenks, Nanai, Daur, and Solon lived.

Campaign
In 1639, Qing forces attacked the Solon and Daur people. A force of 500 under the Evenk chieftain Bombogor tried to resist, but the Qing defeated them and captured the fortresses of  Duochen, Asajin, Yakesa, and Duojin in the following year.

In 1643 the Amur region natives submitted to the Qing.

Aftermath
Those who surrendered were incorporated into the Eight Banners. Although victorious, the Qing later attacked and resettled the Daurs in 1654 and 1656 to prevent them from coming under the control of the Russians.

References

Bibliography
 

Wars involving the Qing dynasty
Conflicts in 1639
Conflicts in 1640
Conflicts in 1641
Conflicts in 1642
Conflicts in 1643